Greenwood is an unincorporated community in Whatcom County, in the U.S. state of Washington.

History
A post office called Greenwood was in operation from 1901 until 1902. The community was named for a grove of evergreen near the original town site.

References

Unincorporated communities in Whatcom County, Washington
Unincorporated communities in Washington (state)